"My Best Friend" is a psychedelic rock song by the Jefferson Airplane. It was written by the band's former drummer Skip Spence. The song appeared on the band's second album, Surrealistic Pillow and was released as a single.

By the time the album was recorded, Spence had left Jefferson Airplane to join Moby Grape. Joe Viglione of Allmusic praised the song as "a beautiful blend of original Jefferson Starship sound with a harmony-ragged Mamas & The Papas meets Spanky & Our Gang's loose folk vaudeville." George Starostin praised it as a slow "catchy pop song." Rolling Stone called it a "country charmer." Doug Collette of Glide Magazine compared the song to tracks on the debut album Jefferson Airplane Takes Off and noted it as "polite, sweet harmony-laden."

Chart history

Personnel
Marty Balin - vocals
Grace Slick - vocals
Jorma Kaukonen - lead guitar
Paul Kantner - rhythm guitar, vocals
Jack Casady - bass guitar
Spencer Dryden - drums

References

1967 songs
1967 singles
Jefferson Airplane songs
Songs written by Skip Spence
Song recordings produced by Rick Jarrard